Onzan-ji  (Onzan Temple) (Japanese: 恩山寺) is a Koyasan Shingon temple in Komatsushima, Tokushima Prefecture, Japan. Temple # 18 on the Shikoku 88 temple pilgrimage, the main image is of Yakushi Nyorai (Bhaiṣajyaguru: "King of Medicine Master and Lapis Lazuli Light").

History
The temple was constructed during Emperor Shōmu's reign. 
In the Tenshō (天正, 1573–1592) era, the temple was destroyed by fire during Chōsokabe Motochika (長宗我部 元親) force.
In the Edo era, the temple was rebuilt with the support of Hachisuka clan (蜂須賀氏).
In the Bunsei (文政, 1804–1830) era, current buildings were constructed.

Cultural Properties
The temple was designated Prefectural Cultural Properties in 1954.

See also
 Shikoku 88 temple pilgrimage

References

External links
 第18番札所 母養山 宝樹院 恩山寺（四国八十八箇ヶ所霊場会公式）

Buddhist pilgrimage sites in Japan
Buddhist temples in Tokushima Prefecture
Kōyasan Shingon temples